Ngangam (Gangam) is a language of the Gurma people spoken in Togo and Benin.

References

Gurma languages
Languages of Togo
Languages of Benin